Binhai (lit. near the sea) is a designated area for city planning of Dongguan, Guangdong province, China.

References 

County-level divisions of Guangdong
Geography of Dongguan